Rennick Glacier is broad glacier, nearly  long, which is one of the largest in Antarctica. It takes its name from Rennick Bay where the glacier reaches the sea. The seaward part of the glacier was photographed by U.S. Navy (USN) Operation Highjump, 1946–47. The upper reaches of the Rennick Glacier were discovered and explored by the U.S. Victoria Land Traverse (VLT) in February 1960, and the first ascent made of Welcome Mountain by John Weihaupt, Alfred Stuart, Claude Lorius and Arnold Heine of the VLT party. On February 10, 1960, Lieutenant Commander Robert L. Dale, pilot of U.S. Navy (USN) Squadron VX-6, evacuated the VLT from 7238S, 16132E, on this glacier, and then conducted an aerial photographic reconnaissance to Rennick Bay on the coast before returning the VLT team to McMurdo Station.

Features 
 Illusion Hills, small hills on the glacier
 Litell Rocks, an area of rock outcrops within the lower Rennick Glacier
 Mount Short, a mountain included by the Rennick Glacier
 Tenterhooks Crevasses

See also
 List of glaciers in the Antarctic
 List of Antarctic ice streams

References

External links

Glaciers of Pennell Coast